Semiaquilegia is a genus of flowering plants of the family Ranunculaceae, native to eastern Asia.

Etymology
The generic name Semiaquilegia is derived from the name for the genus Aquilegia, the  columbines, to which they are closely related.

Species
Species are regularly described, synonymized, or reassigned to other genera, so presently only one is considered valid by most authorities; the type species Semiaquilegia adoxoides. Species names associated with Semiaquilegia are as follows: 
Semiaquilegia adoxoides 
Semiaquilegia dauciformis
Semiaquilegia eastwoodiae
Semiaquilegia ecalcarata  
Semiaquilegia guangxiensis
Semiaquilegia henryi
Semiaquilegia leveilleana  
Semiaquilegia quelpaertensis  
Semiaquilegia rockii

References

 
Ranunculaceae genera